Dillyn Yullrich Leyds (born 12 September 1992 in Somerset West, South Africa) is a South African rugby union player for the South Africa national team and Stade Rochelais in the French Top 14. He can play as a fullback, fly-half or wing.

Career

Youth and Varsity rugby
Leyds was educated at Western Province Preparatory School and went on to Bishops College in Cape Town, where he played for their First XV rugby side in 2009 and 2010, alongside players such as Nizaam Carr, Oli Kebble, Johnny Kôtze, Sam Lane and Tim Swiel.

He represented Western Province at various age-group levels. In 2010, he was included in both their Under-18 Academy Week and Craven Week sides. The following year, the played for the  side in the 2011 Under-19 Provincial Championship, where he scored 133 points in 13 starts to finish second in the points-scoring charts and help his side reach the quarter-finals of the competition. He was a regular in the  squad during the 2012 and 2013 Provincial Championships, helping them reach a final in the former and winning the competition in 2013.

He was jointly the third-highest try scorer in 2012, averaging one try per match in his seven appearances.

2012 IRB Junior World Championship
In 2012, Leyds was a member of the South African Under-20 side that won the 2012 IRB Junior World Championship on home soil. Leyds started their Pool Stage matches against Ireland and England, their semi-final match against Argentina and the final against New Zealand, helping his side to a 22–16 victory over the defending champions to win the title for the first time ever.

Western Province
Leyds was included in the  squad for the 2013 Vodacom Cup competition. He came on as a second-half substitute and scored a conversion with his first touch of the ball, plus added a penalty later to help Western Province to a 28–17 victory.

Western Force and Perth Spirit

He was also named in the  side that played in the 2014 National Rugby Championship.

Return to Western Province
In March 2014,  announced that Leyds would return to the Cape Town-based side for the 2014 Currie Cup Premier Division season.

Stormers

Stade Rochelais
Leyds signed for French Top 14 outfit, La Rochelle, ahead of the 2020–21 season.

Honours

Club 
 La Rochelle
European Rugby Champions Cup: 2021–2022

References

South African rugby union players
Living people
1992 births
People from Somerset West
Rugby union fullbacks
Rugby union fly-halves
Western Force players
Western Province (rugby union) players
Stade Rochelais players
South Africa Under-20 international rugby union players
South African expatriate rugby union players
South African expatriate sportspeople in Australia
Expatriate rugby union players in Australia
Perth Spirit players
South Africa international rugby union players
Stormers players
Rugby union players from the Western Cape